Primo Foods (formerly Primo Smallgoods), is an Australian food and beverage company based in Chullora in Western Sydney, is the largest producer of ham, bacon and smallgoods in the Southern Hemisphere. 

Primo was founded in 1985 by Hungarian immigrant Andrew Lederer after he purchased Sydney's Mayfair Ham Factory. In 2004 Paul Lederer acquired the business after the death of his uncle. In 2014, Brazilian beef giant JBS acquired Primo from Lederer for $1.25 billion US dollars, who subsequently stood down as CEO. The current Chief Operating Officer is Bruce Sabatta.

Sponsorships and Community Engagement

Primo have historically been an active community sponsor. In 2013/14 they sponsored A-League team Western Sydney Wanderers, who were subsequently purchased by a consortium of businessmen led by then Primo CEO Paul Lederer.

References

 Wiley praised for $136m Primo facility | Food Magazine
 Primo Smallgoods Chullora Meat Processing Facility: Environmental Impact ... - Google Books

External links
 Official website

JBS S.A. subsidiaries
Food and drink companies based in Sydney
Food manufacturers of Australia
Food and drink companies established in 1985
1985 establishments in Australia
Manufacturing companies based in Sydney
Meat packers